Marc Girardelli (born 18 July 1963) is an Austrian–Luxembourger former alpine ski racer, a five-time World Cup overall champion who excelled in all five alpine disciplines.

Biography
Born in Lustenau, Austria into a family originally from Valsugana, Italy, Girardelli started skiing at the age of five and was racing at seven. He enjoyed significant success at junior level, winning local competitions in not only alpine skiing but also ski jumping. He competed for Austria until 1976, then  switched to Luxembourg due to disagreements about coaching – the Austrian skiing federation wanted Girardelli to attend a ski boarding school in Schruns,  from Lustenau, while his parents preferred for him to stay in his hometown. In 1981, he started to make significant progress with his first podium (top-three finish) in Wengen, Switzerland, and from that moment was in contention for slalom and giant slalom podiums on a regular basis.

He achieved his first World Cup victory in Sweden in February 1983, but incurred his first major injury two weeks later, tearing all the ligaments, cartilage, and a tendon in his left knee in a crash during a downhill at Lake Louise. In the following season, he won five slalom races and was third in the overall standings.

In 1985, Girardelli won 11 races and the World Cup overall title, followed by another overall title in 1986 and a third in 1989. After another major accident in 1990, in which he narrowly avoided paraplegia, he recovered to win the overall again in 1991 and in 1993 for a record fifth time – a record until Marcel Hirscher won a sixth title in 2017 (Annemarie Moser-Pröll won six women's World Cups).  In total, Girardelli won 46 World Cup races (fifth-most of all time among men) and recorded 100 podiums. 

Because Girardelli retained Austrian citizenship while skiing for Luxembourg, he was ineligible to compete in the 1980 or 1984 Winter Olympics - but also to compete in the 1982 World Championships. (In contrast, regulations did allow to start for Luxembourg in the World Cup). For a while, his appearance at the 1985 World Championships was in doubt, but he was able to show evidence that he was in the process of claiming Luxembourg citizenship. The FIS gave special permission, and he won a silver medal in the slalom and bronze in the giant slalom. Girardelli received Luxembourg citizenship in time to compete in the 1987 World Championships. His first Olympics were in 1988 at Calgary, but he did not win a medal. In 1992 at Albertville, he won silver medals in Super G and giant slalom – the first medals for the Grand Duchy at the Winter Olympics, and Luxembourg's first Olympic medal since Josy Barthel's gold in the 1500 metres in 1952.

Girardelli won eleven World Championship medals, including four golds: (slalom at Saalbach in 1991 and combined at Crans-Montana in 1987, Vail in 1989, and Sierra Nevada in 1996).

His final World Cup race was in the downhill race at Val Gardena on 20 December 1996; he had announced his intention to start the next day in another downhill, but suffered a new knee injury. After failing to start in the following races, he announced his retirement from international competition in January 1997 at age 33.

Girardelli is an honorary citizen of Bulgarian ski resort Bansko. Since 2015, he has been serving as an advisor to the Minister of Tourism of Bulgaria, Nikolina Angelkova, on the matters of winter tourism. On 17 December 2018 Girardelli disclosed that he holds the majoritary share of Yulen AD, the controversial operator of the ski zone of Bansko.

He is an organiser of skiing events in several European winter sports resorts, and also in Portillo, Chile. Since 2005 he is an IBO for kids fashion in sports, called »Marc Girardelli Skiwear«.

World Cup results

Season standings

^

Season titles

Race victories
46 total – (3 downhill, 9 super G, 7 giant slalom, 16 slalom, 11 combined)
 100 podiums

1 
2

World championship results 

 The Super-G in 1993 was cancelled after multiple weather delays.

Olympic results

See also
Ski World Cup Most podiums & Top 10 results

References

External links
 
 
 Marc Girardelli at SkiWorldCup.org
 MarcGirardelli.com – personal web site

1963 births
Living people
People from Lustenau
Luxembourgian male alpine skiers
Austrian male alpine skiers
Olympic alpine skiers of Luxembourg
Olympic silver medalists for Luxembourg
Alpine skiers at the 1988 Winter Olympics
Alpine skiers at the 1992 Winter Olympics
Alpine skiers at the 1994 Winter Olympics
Naturalised citizens of Luxembourg
Austrian people of Italian descent
Olympic medalists in alpine skiing
FIS Alpine Ski World Cup champions
Medalists at the 1992 Winter Olympics
Luxembourgian people of Austrian descent
Sportspeople from Vorarlberg